The Cave-In-Rock Ferry is one of four passenger ferry services that cross the Ohio River into the U.S. state of Kentucky. It connects Illinois Route 1 in Cave-In-Rock, Hardin County, Illinois to Kentucky Route 91, 10.6 miles north of Marion, Kentucky. It is the only public river crossing available between the Brookport Bridge at Paducah, Kentucky and the Shawneetown Bridge at Old Shawneetown, Illinois.

History

See also
Ford's Ferry, from Kentucky to Illinois
Lusk's Ferry, from Illinois to Kentucky
Lusk's Ferry Road
List of crossings of the Ohio River

References

External links
Ferry Services – Illinois Department of Transportation
Ferries – Kentucky Transportation Cabinet
Ferry shuttles commuters, and a few Asian carp, from Illinois to Kentucky by Joe Gisondi, Herald & Review. October 19, 2013.

Hardin County, Illinois
Ferries of Illinois
Ferries of Kentucky
Transportation in Crittenden County, Kentucky
No-fee ferries
Crossings of the Ohio River